Offerton is a civil parish in the Derbyshire Dales district of Derbyshire, England.  The parish contains six listed buildings that are recorded in the National Heritage List for England.   Of these, one is listed at Grade II*, the middle of the three grades, and the others are at Grade II, the lowest grade. The parish is almost entirely rural, and the listed buildings consist of houses, farmhouses and farm buildings.


Key

Buildings

References

Citations

Sources

 

Lists of listed buildings in Derbyshire